Kargin may refer to:

Valentin Alekseevich Kargin (1907–1969), Russian and Soviet chemist
Valery Kargin, Latvian banker
Kargın, Alaca
Kargın, Bigadiç, Turkey
Kargin, Hormozgan, Iran
Kargin, Kerman, Iran